The Black Strat is the nickname for a black Fender Stratocaster guitar played by David Gilmour of the progressive rock band Pink Floyd. It appeared for the first time with Gilmour at the 1970 Bath Festival. Gilmour stated in an interview prior to the auction of his guitar collection that 'The Black Strat' featured in many of Pink Floyd's and his individual albums and was the guitar used for the “Money”, “Comfortably Numb” and “Shine on You Crazy Diamond” solos, among many others.

History
Gilmour purchased the guitar, a 1969 model with a maple cap fingerboard and large headstock, in 1970 from Manny's Music in New York City to replace a similar guitar his parents bought him for his 21st birthday, which had been lost while touring with Pink Floyd in the United States in 1968. The Black Strat was originally a sunburst colour, but had been repainted black at Manny's. Since then, it has undergone numerous modifications.

Modifications

Throughout the 1970s, Gilmour alternated between using necks with maple and rosewood fingerboards on the Stratocaster. In 1972, Gilmour installed an XLR connector to eliminate the hum coming from his Dallas Arbiter Fuzz Face; however, this was quickly removed. He also replaced the original tuners with Kluson tuners. In 1973, a Gibson PAF Humbucker was installed between the bridge and middle positions of the Strat, but he took out the original single coils and put them in the black pickguard later on. In 1976, the original bridge pickup was replaced by a DiMarzio FS-1. This in turn was replaced by a Seymour Duncan SSL-1. In the 1980s he replaced the bridge with a Kahler Tremolo System, which again was later removed. The installation of the Kahler bridge required a section of wood being cut out to accommodate the larger unit, which in turn meant a new piece of wood had to be inserted and sprayed black when the old bridge was returned. He also replaced the original tremolo arm with a shortened one.

In 1986, Gilmour replaced it with three Candy Apple Red Stratocaster guitars with EMG pickups for touring and with a cream Stratocaster for rehearsals during the post Roger Waters era, retiring the Black Strat for display at the Hard Rock Cafe in Dallas, Texas. The guitar was returned to Gilmour in the late 1990s, but having not been displayed in a glass case during its time at the Hard Rock Cafe, it sustained significant damage and the theft of many of its parts.

Due to the constant modifications, the only original parts on the guitar, apart from the body, are believed to be the pickup selector switch and (possibly) the bridge plate.

Performance
After its repair and restoration, Gilmour played the Black Strat again. This includes his On an Island tour of 2006, at Pink Floyd's reunion at Live 8 in 2005, his Rattle That Lock Tour of 2015–2016, for solos on Pink Floyd's final album The Endless River, and his 2015 album Rattle That Lock.

In 2008, Fender announced that their Custom Shop would be making a David Gilmour Signature Black Stratocaster. Technicians worked with both Gilmour and his guitar technician Phil Taylor to recreate the Black Strat. The finished model features in the current Custom Shop lineup.

Taylor is also the author of a book The Black Strat which covers in depth all the modifications and changes made to the Black Strat, along with its use on Pink Floyd tours and albums.

Sale

In early 2019 Gilmour announced he would auction many of his guitars for charity, including the Black Strat and the #0001 Strat.

See also
The 0001 Strat
 List of guitars

References

 
Guitar World, 2006
"Guitar Heroes", Sound Magazine (1983) 

Fender Stratocasters
Individual guitars
1969 musical instruments
David Gilmour